Falcon Stadium is an outdoor football stadium in the western United States, on the campus of the U.S. Air Force Academy near Colorado Springs, Colorado. It is the home field of the Air Force Falcons of the Mountain West Conference, and also holds the academy's graduation ceremonies each spring.

History

From 1956 to 1961, Air Force played its home games at various sites along the Front Range in Colorado. Most games were played in Denver at the University of Denver's stadium, but several were played in Colorado Springs, Pueblo, and CU's Folsom Field in Boulder.

Planned in 1955, Falcon Stadium opened  in 1962, at a cost of $3.5 million, and has a current seating capacity of 46,692.  The first game was on September 22, a 34–0 victory over Colorado State. It was officially dedicated four weeks later on October 20, with a ceremony which included the Thunderbirds.

Construction
The U.S. Air Force Academy lies at the base of the Rampart Range of the Rocky Mountains, northwest of adjacent Colorado Springs.

With an unbalanced design and a traditional north–south alignment, the western sideline has the press box and two large grandstand tiers above the main bowl; the eastern side has a single tier, bordered by seven separate sections of grandstands.

Elevation

The elevation was essential for preparing the NFL's New England Patriots' for their  NFL Mexico Game at Estadio Azteca in Mexico City in mid-November. (Belichick's father Steve was a longtime assistant football coach and scout at Navy.) The previous Sunday, the Patriots had defeated the Broncos 41–16 in Denver, and they remained in Colorado to prepare for their Mexico trip. The Los Angeles Rams employed a similar strategy the following year, with practices at Falcon Stadium, but the  game was moved to Los Angeles because of poor field conditions at Azteca.

Improvements
Falcon Stadium had a natural grass field for its first 44 years, although the sideline areas where teams stood were artificial turf since the 1980s.  Prior to the 2006 season, synthetic FieldTurf was installed at a cost of $750,000.

The stadium has been expanded twice, and the 2005 renovation lowered the total seating capacity. Permanent lighting was installed in Falcon Stadium in 2002 at a cost of $500,000, and the video screen at the south end of the field debuted in 2004. A new sound system was also installed for the 2006 season.

At its installation in 2016, it was the largest in the Mountain West Conference and amongst the service academies. A second video board was also installed behind the northeast stands prior to the 2016 season.

Events

Ice hockey
On January 1, 2019, it was announced that Falcon Stadium would host the 2020 NHL Stadium Series outdoor game, with the Colorado Avalanche hosting the Los Angeles Kings.

See also
 List of NCAA Division I FBS football stadiums

References

External links
 Air Force Academy Official Athletic Site
 Air Force Athletics – Falcon Stadium 
 Sports-Venue.Info – Falcon Stadium information & photos

1962 establishments in Colorado
College football venues
Air Force Falcons football
Air Force Falcons sports venues
Sports venues completed in 1962